The 1925–26 season of Atromitos F.C. was the 3rd in the club's history and the second season that the club were participating in the Athens Football Clubs Association League.

The chairman of the team was Andreas Tsouroutsoylou, the person that created the club.

Athens Football Clubs Association League

Competition: The league was conducted in one group, from which the first team would be declared champions.

Atromitos finished at the fourth place among seven teams.

League table

GF = Goals for; GA = Goals against; GD = Goal difference; Pts = Points

Group Stage Matches

References

"Flutter in Glory" by Pavlos Katonis

1925-26
Greek football clubs 1925–26 season